Watters may refer to:

Watters (surname), a list of notable people with the name
Watters, Pennsylvania, an unincorporated community in Butler County, Pennsylvania, United States
Watters Gallery, a former art gallery in Sydney, Australia
Watters Smith Memorial State Park, a historical park in West Virginia

See also
Watterstown, Wisconsin, a town in Grant County, Wisconsin, United States
Waters (name)
Watter (disambiguation)